Eyserheide (English: Eys heathland, Limburgish: Ezerhei) is a hamlet in the southeastern Netherlands. It is located close to the village of Eys in the municipality of Gulpen-Wittem, Limburg, around 15 km east of Maastricht. The name refers to a former heathland in the area. The village has a population of 90 people.

Together with the neighboring hamlets of Elkenrade and Mingersberg, it is located on the plateau of Ubachsberg. The village is known for the Eyserbosweg, a steep hill to the south of the village which is part of the Amstel Gold Race. To the west of the village is the forest Eyserbos.

National monuments 
The hamlet has four farms that have been designated national monuments.

Notable people 
 Mirjam van Laar -  Dutch highjump recordholder

References 

Populated places in Limburg (Netherlands)
Gulpen-Wittem